Wrestling events at the 1987 Southeast Asian Games was held between 10 September to 12 September at Grogol Youth Center.

Medal summary

Freestyle Men

Greco Roman Men

References
 http://eresources.nlb.gov.sg/newspapers/Digitised/Article/straitstimes19870911-1.2.56.38
https://news.google.com/newspapers?nid=x8G803Bi31IC&dat=19870911&printsec=frontpage&hl=en
 http://eresources.nlb.gov.sg/newspapers/Digitised/Article/straitstimes19870913-1.2.43.4

1987 Southeast Asian Games
Southeast Asian Games
Wrestling at the Southeast Asian Games
International wrestling competitions hosted by Indonesia